"Zemjo Makedonska" (in Macedonian: Земјо Македонска) is a Macedonian folk song about Macedonia. The lyrics of the song are based on a poem by Ivan Vazov dedicated to the Montenegrin Uprising from 1876-1877 against the Ottomans.

Interpretations of the song

This song has been interpreted by lot of Macedonian singers. One interpretation of this song was by Vaska Ilieva. Another interpretation was made by the Macedonian pop singer Vlado Janevski for the project "Makedonija Zasekogas" which contains old folklore Macedonian songs sung by the leading pop singers in Macedonia.

References

See also 
Music of the Republic of Macedonia

Macedonian folk songs